Sandoy ("Sand Island") is the first of the five southern islands that make up the Faroe chain, the fifth biggest of all the Faroe Islands, an autonomous region of the Kingdom of Denmark. It also refers to the region that includes this island along with Skúvoy and Stóra Dímun. , the largest population centre on the island is the village of Sandur with a population of 532. Other settlements include Skarvanes, Skopun, Skálavík, Húsavík and Dalur.

Sandoy gets its name from the large beach at Sandur, and the general sandy soil of the island. It is the only island with dunes.

There are similarly named islands, Sanday in the Orkney Islands, Sanday in the Inner Hebrides and Sandøy in Norway.

At present the Sandoyartunnilin is being constructed between the centre of the island and the port of Gamlarætt on Streymoy. Construction started in 2019 and is not expected to be finished before 2023.

Agriculture 
The island is considered the best island for agriculture due to its fertile sandy soil. The largest potato farm in the country is located on the island. And people who have gardening interests have generally an easier time getting plants to grow here.

On 19 August 2015 the agricultural union "Veltan" was founded for people who have an interest in gardening and farming, their aim is to improve conditions for a self-sustaining way of life, and agricultural businesses.

The island supports 6,878 sheep, not including lambs. There are two grind beaches used for whaling, in Húsavík and Sandur.

Important Bird Areas
The island's surrounding bird cliffs and steep slopes have been identified as an Important Bird Area (IBA) by BirdLife International because of their significance as a breeding site for seabirds, especially northern fulmars (50,000 pairs), Manx shearwaters (5000 pairs), European storm petrels (50,000 pairs), European shags (150 pairs), great skuas (15 pairs), Atlantic puffins (70,000 pairs) and black guillemots (400 pairs).  An additional IBA on the island comprises the lowland areas around the village of Sandur, with their moorland and peat bogs, and the lakes Gróthúsvatn, Lítlavatn, Sandsvatn and Stóravatn, because they support 100-150 breeding pairs of Eurasian whimbrels.

See also
 List of islands of the Faroe Islands

Further reading

 Jørgensen, Gunni, and Jóannes Rasmussen. Glacial Striae, Roches Moutonnées, and Ice Movements on Sandoy (Faeroe Islands). Communications géologiques, no 314. [Copenhagen, Denmark]: Muséum de minéralogie et de géologie de l'Université de Copenhague, 1978.
 Lawson, Ian, et al. 2005. "Historical Ecology on Sandoy, Faroe Islands: Palaeoenvironmental and Archaeological Perspectives". Human Ecology. 33, no. 5: 651–684.

Gallery

References

External links

 
Islands of the Faroe Islands
Important Bird Areas of the Faroe Islands